Maidenhead Railway Bridge, also known as Maidenhead Viaduct and The Sounding Arch, carries the Great Western Main Line (GWML) over the River Thames between Maidenhead, Berkshire and Taplow, Buckinghamshire, England. It is a single structure of two tall wide red brick arches buttressed by two over-land smaller arches. It crosses the river on the Maidenhead-Bray Reach which is between Boulter's Lock and Bray Lock and is near-centrally rooted in the downstream end of a very small island.

The Maidenhead Bridge was designed by the Great Western Railway Company's engineer, the noted mechanical and civil engineer Isambard Kingdom Brunel, and it was completed in 1838, but not brought into use until 1 July 1839. While it was being constructed, the innovative low-rise arches of the structure attracted considerable criticism and controversy surrounding their alleged lack of stability; as a result, the centring for the arches was left in place until its destruction during a heavy storm in late 1839, yet the arches stayed up, effectively vindicating Brunel's design.  During 1861, dual-gauge track was installed across the structure, allowing both broad gauge and standard gauge services to cross it.  During the late 1890s, the bridge was widened on either side to allow the structure to carry an arrangement of four standard gauge tracks, a task which was supervised by the civil engineer Sir John Fowler, who placed a high level of importance upon preserving the bridge's original design and appearance.

Today, the Maidenhead Bridge forms a key crossing along the eastern section of the Great Western Main Line, allowing trains to proceed to and from the line's terminus in the capital, London Paddington station.  During the 2010s, the tracks across the structure were provisioned with overhead line equipment and associated infrastructure as to allow electric traction to use the route. The Maidenhead Bridge features in Rain, Steam and Speed – The Great Western Railway, painted by J. M. W. Turner during 1844 and now in the National Gallery, London. It is approximate to the finish line of an annual day of rowing races, known as the Maidenhead Regatta. The Thames towpath passes directly under the right-hand arch (facing upstream), which is also known as the Sounding Arch as a result of its spectacular echo. During July 2012, the Maidenhead Railway Bridge was upgraded to a Grade I listed structure in light of its historical importance; to this day, the arches of the structure remain the flattest to have ever been constructed.

History

Background
During the 1830s, the famed mechanical and civil engineer Isambard Kingdom Brunel developed a plan for a  railway running on an east–west alignment in between the key cities of London and Bristol. The line, which would become known as the Great Western Railway, would feature exceptional attention to maintaining either level ground or gentle gradients of no greater than 1 in 1000 through the majority of the route. A key crossing of the envisioned railway occurred between Maidenhead, Berkshire and Taplow, Buckinghamshire, where the line would cross over the River Thames; Brunel himself undertook the design for this structure.

The building of a bridge over the Thames at this location had to make provisions for the necessary navigational clearance as not to unduly hinder the traditional river shipping present. However, this clearance requirement, when combined with Brunel's desire to maintaining a gentle gradient of 1 in 1,320 for the railway lines, posed some complication to the bridge's design. There was a strong distaste for any compromise upon the gradient which had been set out for the whole route as he believed that this would negatively affect both passenger comfort and the maximum speeds of the trains that could otherwise have been avoided.

The first plan devised by Brunel for the river crossing had envisaged the building of triple-arch viaduct at the site, however he later chose to discard this early concept in favour of the design that was subsequently built and is still in use today. According to author Paul Clements, the design selected by Brunel had been directly inspired by earlier experiments performed by his father, Marc Brunel, during 1832, which Isambard had at the time financed. Brunel employed calculus principles in the designing of the bridge's critical semi-elliptical arches, which supported the structure. In common with the design of the other large bridges that were built along the line, Brunel achieved a reduction in the forces acting through the brickwork via the adoption of internal longitudinal walls and voids; these served to lighten the superstructure above the arches as well as to reduce the bridge's overall weight.

As designed, the bridge carries the railway across the river on a deck supported by a pair of elliptical brick arches which, at the time of their construction, were the widest and flattest in the world. Each arch has a span of 128 feet (39 metres), combined with a rise of only 24 feet (7 metres). The flatness of the arches had been deemed necessary to avoid creating a raised "hump" on the deck of the bridge, which would have gone against Brunel's accommodation of early locomotives and his practice of maximising operational economy by building lines with flat or very gentle gradients (locally 1 in 1,320, which is less than 0.1 per cent), which had the benefit of reducing the running costs of the trains.

Construction

On 31 August 1835, the Great Western Railway Act was passed by Parliament, authorising the building of the line.  Work commenced on its construction during the following year.  The resident engineer who oversaw the building of Maidenhead Bridge was John Wallis Hammond, while a William Chadwick was appointed as the contractor for the construction of the structure.

As originally built, the Maidenhead Bridge possessed a length of 235 metres and a width of 9.1 metres. It was visually symmetrical about the central river pier, which was founded on top of an existing small island sited roughly midstream in the river. The two main arches had a semi-elliptical shape, each having a span of 39 metres with a very low rise of 7.4 metres. The approach viaducts featured four round-headed flood arches; the short arches nearest the river bank having a span of 6.4 metres while the six flanking arches having an 8.5 metre span each. The elevations were identical and had Doric pilasters positioned between the river and bankside arches and corniced parapets throughout, while the deck comprised a series of stone slabs. The brickwork, both on the elevations and under the arches, was executed in London stock brick.

The innovative low-rise arches over the Thames became subject to considerable controversy concerning their stability or purported lack thereof. During the construction of the bridge, the timber centring used to build the arches was eased; on the eastern arch, the three lowest rings of brickwork began to settle, separating from the body of the arch across a section of between 7.6 metres and 9.1 metres. Critics were keen to hold this up as proof that the design of the arches was flawed. However, it was soon established that the problem had been a product of the mortar having not been fully hardened, while also appeared worse on the spandrels than midway underneath the arches. During July 1838, William Chadwick, the contractor, acknowledged his responsibility for this occurrence.

Remedial work was carried out before the centring was eased again in October 1838. The centring was then left in place over the winter. Author E.T. MacDermot has claimed that, as the bridge neared completion, the board of the Great Western Railway themselves had doubts that the arches would be able to stay up under the weight of passing trains and issued an order to Brunel, instructing him to leave the wooden formwork used to construct the arches in place. However, Brunel decided to lower this formwork slightly so that it provided no structural effect, but gave the appearance of being in place and supporting the bridge. Later on, the formwork was washed away during heavy flooding, but the bridge remained standing with no ill effects; in light of this happenstance, the strength of the arches was finally accepted and Brunel's design was vindicated.

Operational life

As built and opened on 1 July 1839, the bridge carried a pair of Brunel's  "broad" gauge railway tracks over the Thames. Over the following decades, traffic to and from London increased enormously. During 1861, work was carried out to install mixed gauge tracks throughout the route between London and Bristol, thereby allowing standard gauge traffic to traverse the structure.

In anticipation of the final conversion to the standard rail gauge, which was performed during 1890–1892, the bridge was widened on each side to carry four standard gauge tracks. The expansion was undertaken sympathetically, resulting in the outward shape of the bridge remaining almost unaltered, but the new elevations and arches were constructed using redder Cattybrook brick. The prexisting London stock brick arches were also encased in Cattybrook brick to secure uniformity of colour, causing the distinctive chamfered step between the original Brunel arch and Fowler's additions. To avoid any differential settlement between the old and new sections, the foundation extensions were close piled and covered with a timber grillage, before being filled with concrete.

During 1950, the western half of the bridge was awarded Grade II* listing; in April 1985, the eastern half also received the same level of listing. During July 2012, the Maidenhead Railway Bridge was upgraded to Grade I listed status by the Department for Culture, Media and Sport following a consultation with English Heritage.

Modifications for Crossrail

The Crossrail development to build the Elizabeth line saw the long-delayed overhead electrification of the Great Western line between Paddington and Reading. At one stage, to accommodate construction activity in the area, it had been planned for a temporary construction depot to be created immediately adjacent to the Maidenhead Bridge, in Guards Club Park on the Berkshire side of the bridge. However, this decision was subsequently reversed and such a site was not established, although the bridge itself still underwent some modification as to later accommodate the installation of overhead line equipment and associated infrastructure. The latest Crossrail Environmental Statement: states:
"The OHLE (Overhead Line Equipment) requires that supporting posts be founded on the bridge structure. These will be positioned so as not to disrupt the symmetry of the bridge. Three sets of masts will be fixed at the bridge supports and a further two sets will be fixed at the far ends of the bridge. The masts will be fixed such that they may be removed in the future without damaging the bridge as it stands today."
The report also states:
"It is proposed that the OHLE over Maidenhead railway bridge will use masts with wires suspended from cantilevers, since these will be visually lighter structures than the gantries to be used along other parts of the route. The masts will however, have a significant adverse landscape impact: they will affect important views along the river and the character of the river corridor; they will affect the setting of the Riverside Conservation Area; and they will affect the setting of the listed railway bridge and the setting of the adjacent Grade I listed road bridge."
As a means of reducing the visual impact of electrification on the historic bridge area, the possibility of adopting third rail electrification for this section of the line was proposed; however, following a study of this option, all use of third rail for this purpose was ultimately rejected upon review.

See also
Crossings of the River Thames

References

External links 

 Newcomen Society information
 

Arch bridges in the United Kingdom
Bridges across the River Thames
Bridges completed in 1838
Railway bridges in Berkshire
Railway bridges in Buckinghamshire
Bridges by Isambard Kingdom Brunel
Buildings and structures in the Royal Borough of Windsor and Maidenhead
Great Western Main Line
Grade I listed buildings in Berkshire
Grade I listed buildings in Buckinghamshire
Grade I listed railway bridges and viaducts
Maidenhead